John Fleming Wilson, (February 22, 1877 – March 5, 1922), was an American author, newspaperman, and prolific writer of short stories and adventure novels, best known for his travel books about sea life. Many of his books and short stories were made into films during the 1910s through the 1930s.

Early life

Wilson was born on February 22, 1877, in Erie, Pennsylvania. He was the son of Presbyterian minister Dr Joseph Rogers Wilson (1847–1929), and Viola Earl Eaton (1845–1933). His father worked with Dr. Samuel Johnson who founded the Portland Academy. He received his education at Parsons College in Iowa, and at Princeton University in 1900. He studied classical and modern literature, particularly subjects that related to oceans, bays, rivers, and ports. He spent much of his boyhood at sea. He married Elena Burt in July 1906, in Newport, Oregon. He was later divorced and had no children.

He was a deep-sea sailor, a ship's officer in the merchant marine, wireless operator, and lived for a time in Japan. His study of nautical books and the trips out to sea gave him the opportunity to write sea stories.

Career

Wilson was a schoolteacher from 1900 to 1902 at the Portland Academy. He then worked with a newspaper company from 1902 to 1905. He was the author of several books and contributed to short stories for both American and European magazines.

Newspapers

In 1905, Wilson lived in Honolulu, Hawaii on the writing staff of The Honolulu Advertiser. A number of his stories were published in The Advertiser, in 1907 and 1908. In 1906, he was editor of the San Francisco The Argonaut, and a member of the Bohemian Club.

In 1907, he founded the Newport Signal, of Newport, Oregon. He was also associated with The Oregonian and The Pacific Monthly.

In 1907, Wilson corresponded by letters to author and editor Charles Warren Stoddard (1843–1909), when Stoddard was living in Monterey, California.

Carmel
In the early 1910s, Wilson lived in Carmel Point, near Carmel-by-the-Sea. He built a little cottage at 14th Avenue and San Antonio Street as a writer's studio. He gave up newspaper work and went into short story writing. Many of his stories appeared in magazines like The Pacific Monthly, Sunset, The Saturday Evening Post, and Cosmopolitan. The books he wrote while in Carmel were Across the Latitudes (1911), The Land Claimers (1911), The Man Who Came Back (1912), The Princess of Sorry Valley (1913), and The Master Key (1914). 

In 1912, he sold the studio to realtor Philip Wilson Sr. (1862–1944) (not a relative) who also owned the Philip Wilson Building downtown, and developed the first and only Carmel Golf Course.

World War I
Wilson served overseas in France with the 7th infantry battalion of the Canadian Army during World War I from 1917-1919. He was gassed by German shells. After the war he returned as a patient in a government hospital at Arrowhead Springs, San Bernardino. He then went to Martin's Sanitarium in Venice, California.

Death
Wilson died, from burns caused by a gas heater, on March 5, 1922, at his home in Venice, at the age of 55. His remains were brought to Hemet, California and funeral services were head at the San Jacinto Valley Cemetery in San Jacinto, California.

Legacy
Writer Herbert Heron wrote about Wilson in the Carmel Pine Cone in 1966. He said 

Raymond Blathway wrote of him and said:

Filmography

 The Making of a Man (1906 short story The Outing Magazine); silent drama film in 1911 Biograph Company
 The Man Who Came Back (1912 novel); silent film in 1924
 The Master Key (short story); film serial in 1914 directed by Robert Z. Leonard.
 Learning to Be a Father (short story) 1915
 Their Golden Wedding (short story) 1915
 A Soul at Stake (short story), written by Wilson and scenarioized by Calder Johnstone; silent short Oriental drama in 1916.
 Never Too Old to Woo (short story) 1917; silent film.
 The Uncharted Seas (Sep 1920 short story-Munsey's Magazine); silent romance drama film 1921
 The Bonded Woman (short story) 1922; silent drama film; from Wilson's book The Saving of John Somers
 The Man Who Married His Own Wife (Apr 1922 short story – Hearst's International-Cosmopolitan); drama film in May 1, 1922; directed by Stuart Paton and written by George Hively
 Road of Hell and the Spanish-language ‘’Camino del infierno’’ (novel) 1931
 The Man Who Came Back (1912 novel); film in 1931

Publications
List of works from Wilson include the following:

See also
 Timeline of Carmel-by-the-Sea, California
 List of Historic Homes in Carmel Point

References

External links

 Fred Lockley Papers and Addenda: Finding Aid
 Charles Warren Stoddard Collection: Finding Aid
 John Fleming Wilson Other Works
 John Fleming Wilson Filmography

1877 births
1922 deaths
Writers from California
People from Erie, Pennsylvania
20th-century American writers
20th-century American male writers
American military personnel of World War I
Princeton University alumni